Healers of the Dead Sea is a 30-minute CBS documentary regarding Dead Sea Scrolls and the Essenes produced by John Marco Allegro and Douglas Edwards.

Allegro narrated and had begun work on the film for the BBC in 1980, under the alternative title "The Mystery of the Dead Sea Scrolls". The film charted the discovery of the scrolls, showed how they had survived and emphasized their importance, guiding the viewer around the first century landscape of Qumran. Allegro aimed to increase public interest in the discovery by letting them imagine their way around the various features, showing its orientation towards Jerusalem  where the expected river of life-giving waters were assumed to have come from in some prophesied time in the future. It guided the viewer around the banquet hall, scriptorium, watercourses and baptismal cisterns to give a feeling of reality to the times. Allegro also starts to discuss how to do Essene healing magic.

See also
The Dead Sea Scrolls and the Christian myth
The Sacred Mushroom and the Cross

References

External links
John M Allegro – Healers of the Dead Sea – post 1985, Produced by CBS Television, with Douglas Edwards
John Marco Allegro Scrolls Scholar and Freethinker - Itinerant Musician and Spiritual Pilgrim
Healers of the Dead Sea, Narration on YouTube

1985 films
American documentary films
Dead Sea Scrolls
1980s English-language films
1980s American films